Georgi Mariyanov (born 25 July 1993) is a Bulgarian professional footballer who plays as a midfielder for Bulgarian First League club CSKA 1948 Sofia.

References

External links

1993 births
Living people
Bulgarian footballers
First Professional Football League (Bulgaria) players
Second Professional Football League (Bulgaria) players
FC Strumska Slava Radomir players
PFC Litex Lovech players
FC CSKA 1948 Sofia players
Association football midfielders